BB Airways was a Nepalese airline based in Kathmandu, Nepal. It was established and started operations in September 2012. The airline's hub was Tribhuvan International Airport, from where it flew to three international destinations. The airline made its first flight on 13 October 2012 to Kuala Lumpur. The Japanese investment company TBI Group supported the airline, which was managed and promoted by the Non Resident Nepali Association.

History
BB Airways received its Air Operator Certificate on 12 April 2012 allowing operations to seven international destinations from Nepal: Kuala Lumpur, Bangkok, Hong Kong, Singapore, Doha, Delhi and Tokyo. It started scheduled services from October 2012, but had to cease operations again several months later, as the leasing contract ran out.

In April 2013, the airline tried to restart its scheduled services by leasing two Airbus A320s. On 30 March 2014, while still operation no active aircraft, BB Airways signed a Memorandum of Understanding with MEGA Maldives Airlines in which the two carriers agreed to "collaborate on developing flights and sharing of resources".

In 2017, BB Airways purchased a three decades old Boeing 757 from Nepal Airlines, with which it was planning to use to restart operations on the route Kathmandu-New Delhi. However, the Civil Aviation Authority of Nepal abstained from issuing an Air operator's certificate arguing that it would take at least one and half year to get a permit to restart its flight operation.

In July 2019, the airline sold their sole Boeing 757.

Destinations
BB Airways operated from Tribhuvan International Airport to two destinations in Asia:

Fleet

Current fleet
As of October 2020, BB Airways does not possess or operate any planes.

Former fleet

References

Airlines established in 2012
Defunct airlines of Nepal
2012 establishments in Nepal